Corpus Christi is a 2019 drama film directed by Jan Komasa and written by Mateusz Pacewicz. It premiered at 2019 Venice Film Festival Venice Days section. It was also shown in the Contemporary World Cinema section at the 2019 Toronto International Film Festival. At Venice Days, the film won the Europa Cinemas Label Award and the Edipo Re Inclusion Award. It was also selected as the Polish entry for the Best International Feature Film at the 92nd Academy Awards, making the final nomination. The film tells the story of a young Polish man released from a juvenile detention facility who, having been frustrated in his hope of becoming a priest, poses as one and is fortuitously asked to replace a village priest.

Plot
Daniel is a devout Catholic serving a sentence for second-degree murder, but his criminal background prevents him from pursuing his dream of becoming a priest upon release. He is assigned to work in a sawmill in a village, and while visiting the local Catholic church, he pretends to be a priest. The vicar of that church meets Daniel wholly believing his lie, and leaves him in charge of the church while he is away for a medical treatment. Daniel begins performing all the duties of a priest and enjoys it.

The parishioners enjoy his unorthodox methods, even his unexpected claim from the pulpit to be a murderer, but they have mixed feelings when he starts asking about a recent car accident that left the community united in anger against the person they believe responsible, an adult man driving alone who died in the crash that also killed six teenagers in the other car. The man had been an unpopular outcast for years, notorious for violent behavior and threats, while the villagers refuse to entertain the idea that the teenagers had been responsible. Daniel learns from a new friend, Marta, whose brother was one of the victims, that she secretly has a video her brother had sent her hours before the accident, showing the group (including the driver) drinking heavily and doing drugs, but she has not shared it. The mayor warns Daniel away from pursuing the matter further, insists that the issue has been put to rest. The point of contention is whether the driver should be buried in the village cemetery with the other victims. Daniel discovers that months after the accident his cremated remains await burial and many of the villagers have sent hateful, threatening letters to his widow, who has been ostracized for maintaining that her husband had been sober for years and did not cause the crash. Daniel and a guilt-ridden Marta confront the villagers with these letters and Daniel decides to conduct a burial service for the solo driver. Marta's mother throws her out of the house for bringing out the letters, and she asks to stay at the temporary rectory with Daniel; while there, they make love.

During the burial service, many of the villagers put aside their hate and pay their respects. Before the Mass planned to follow the burial, the priest from Daniel's youth detention center arrives, having been tipped off that the village's new priest is an impostor. He tells Daniel to pack his bags immediately, but Daniel sneaks out a window and goes to the church to celebrate his "farewell Mass". Before starting, he removes his shirt to display his tattoos, and leaves the church. Daniel is sent back to jail where the brother of the man he murdered is now a fellow convict. They engage in a brutal fight, Daniel gains the upper hand, and the other prisoners allow him to walk free.

Cast
 Bartosz Bielenia as Daniel
 Aleksandra Konieczna as Lidia the sexton
 Eliza Rycembel as Marta Sosińska
 Leszek Lichota as the Mayor
 Łukasz Simlat as Father Tomasz
 Tomasz Ziętek as Pinczer
 Barbara Kurzaj as the Widow
 Zdzisław Wardejn as Father Wojciech

Production
The script for Corpus Christi was written by Mateusz Pacewicz with consultation help from Krzysztof Rak, but after director Jan Komasa read it, he felt the story and especially the character of Daniel needed to be pushed further, so he added a "troubled background" to Daniel's story. Komasa has also said that the car accident that caused such trauma for characters in the film is a symbol for the 2010 Smolensk air disaster, in which 96 people died in a plane crash, including Poland's president and top officials. The film's cinematography was shot in a "a grim, desaturated palette".

The film's production ran into controversy because a man claimed the film was actually based on his real life experiences and his efforts to get in contact with the film's producers were met with silence. The producers have said that the film is not based on this man's life, and instead on various cases of fraud in the priesthood. Pacewicz has said that fake priests are a fairly common occurrence in Poland, and every couple months a new case is discovered; they are often "about the need for a sort of social security for the underprivileged to become a trustworthy priest which is a great form of social status for many".<ref>{{cite web |last=Ramos |first=Dino-Ray |title='Corpus Christis Mateusz Pacewicz And Bartosz Bielenia Talk How A Polish Film About Fake Priesthood Became A Universal Story |url=https://deadline.com/video/corpus-christi-awardsline-screening-series-bartosz-belenia-mateusz-pacewicz-jan-komasa-interview/ |website=Deadline Hollywood |date=6 January 2020 |access-date=1 April 2020}}</ref>

Most of the filming took place in Jaśliska, south-eastern Poland. One of the scenes was filmed on a barge at Lake Rożnów in Tabaszowa.

AwardsCorpus Christi was nominated for Best International Film at the 92nd Academy Awards. The film also won 11 Polish Academy Awards including Best Film, Best Director, Best Script, Best Actor. The film also won ten awards at the Gdynia Film Festival, including Best Director, Best Script, Journalists' Award and Audience Award. It won the Silver Star and Best Actor Award for Bartosz Bielenia at the El Gouna Film Festival, and a Special Mention at the Reykjavik International Film Festival. At Luxembourg's CinEast, the film won the Special Jury Prize and the Critics' Prize. Bartosz Bielenia also won the award for Best Actor at the Chicago International Film Festival and Stockholm International Film Festival. He also won the Shooting Stars Award for the most promising up-and-coming European actor.

Reception
The website's critical consensus states, "Led by an impressive performance from Bartosz Bielenia, Corpus Christi thoughtfully and engagingly examines questions of faith and redemption." It also has a score of 77 out of 100 on Metacritic, based on 20 critics, indicating "generally favorable reviews".
 Variety's Peter Debruge called the film "stunning" and "quietly subversive", despite a few plot points that feel like a soap-opera to him. "Bielenia is never less than totally compelling," wrote Christy Lemire for RogerEbert.com, adding that "this is a complex character full of layers and contradictions." The Washington Post's Ann Hornaday described the film as "an absorbing, spiritually attuned drama" and added that "Bielenia presents the perfect embodiment of haunted asceticism" while "Komasa's careful framing and lighting reveal him to be innocent-looking one moment and more menacing the next". Writing in the Polish magazine Polityka'', Janusz Wróblewski described the film as more suspenseful than the classic Western films, and lauded the ways in which it exorcises the complexities of Poland's past.

See also
 List of submissions to the 92nd Academy Awards for Best International Feature Film
 List of Polish submissions for the Academy Award for Best International Feature Film

References

External links
 

2019 films
2019 drama films
Films about Catholicism
French drama films
Polish drama films
2010s Polish-language films
Films shot in Poland
2010s French films